Bareikis is a Lithuanian surname. Notable people with the surname include:

 Aidas Bareikis (born 1967), Lithuanian artist
 Arija Bareikis (born 1966), American actress
 Osvaldas Bareikis (born 1993), Lithuanian Paralympic judoka
  (born 1986), Lithuanian actor

Lithuanian-language surnames